Whistle-blowing Policy in Nigeria is an anti-corruption programme that encourages people to voluntarily disclose information about fraud, bribery, looted government funds, financial misconduct, government assets and any other form of corruption or theft to the Nigeria's Federal Ministry of Finance. A whistle-blower who provides information about any financial mismanagement or tip about any stolen funds to the ministry's portal is rewarded or entitled to 2.5% - 5% percentage from the recovered funds by the Nigeria government. The policy was launched on December 21, 2016 by Nigeria's Federal Government and facilitated through the Federal Ministry of Finance.

Funds recovered through the whistle-blowing policy
It was reported that within the first two months of the Whistle-blowing policy in Nigeria that Nigeria's Federal Government recovered over $178 million that were stolen from the government. By June 5, 2017, Federal Ministry of Finance received a total of 2,150 tips from the public, 128 tips came through the website of the ministry, 1,192 was through phone calls, 540 through SMS and 290 through email to the ministry. By July/August 2017, a total of 5000 tips was received. In October 2017, the Acting Chairman of the Economic and Financial Crimes Commission (EFCC), Ibrahim Magu said that N527,643,500; $53,222.747; GBP21,222,890 and Euro 547,730 was recovered since the policy was launched.

Ikoyi Whistle-blower  
In 2017, a whistler-blower helped the Nigeria government to recover $43.5million, GBP27,800 and N23.2million at No. 16 Osborne Road, Ikoyi, Lagos, Nigeria. It was also reported that Federal Ministry of Finance paid the whistler-blower the sum of N421million.

Whistle-blower Protection
To protect whistle-blowers, civil society organizations have been engaged in a number of advocacy to ensure that people who blow whistle are protected. MacArthur Foundation is currently funding African Centre for Media & Information Literacy (AFRICMIL) to launch a whistle-blower campaign known as Corruption Anonymous.

Criticism
Health advocates have urged Nigeria government to use the recovered funds to fund immunization and other health issues in Nigeria.

References

Whistleblower protection legislation
Anti-corruption measures
Corruption in Nigeria